Zamia angustifolia is a species of plant in the family Zamiaceae. It is found in the Bahamas and Cuba. It is threatened by habitat loss.

References

angustifolia
Flora of Cuba
Flora of the Bahamas
Plants described in 1791
Taxonomy articles created by Polbot